Carlo Reali (born 6 December 1930) is an Italian actor, voice actor and film editor.

Biography
Born in Padua, Reali was a frequent visitor of the many theatres across Rome before his career began. He eventually found his place in the cinema working as an actor and he even got to make collaborations with Bud Spencer in several of his films. Reali also starred in films that would later become international successes such as La Cage aux Folles and he is also well known for his work as a film editor.

Reali has dubbed many actors which include Steve Martin, Eli Wallach, Bob Hoskins, Danny DeVito, Michael Keaton, Don Ameche and Tim Curry. He has gained international recognition for voicing Palpatine in the Italian version of the Star Wars franchise since 1999 as well as Bob Kelso in the Italian version of Scrubs. Reali has also done dubbing work for Disney. For example, he has voiced Horace Horsecollar in the Italian version of The Prince and the Pauper as well as Captain Hook in his follow-up appearances.

Filmography

Cinema

As actor
Escape by Night (1960)
Michelino Cucchiarella (1964)
The Visit (1964)
L'amor breve (1969)
Una coccarda per il re (1970)
Blackie the Pirate (1971)
Il mostro (1977)
La Cage aux Folles (1978)
Flatfoot in Africa (1978)
Odds and Evens (1978)
Lo chiamavano Bulldozer (1978)
The Sheriff and the Satellite Kid (1979)
Everything Happens to Me (1980)
Buddy Goes West (1981)
Banana Joe (1981)
Bedrooms (1997)
Monella (1998)
Excellent Cadavers (1999)
Detective per caso (2019)

As editor
 The Laughing Woman (1969)
 Ostia (1970)
 A Bay of Blood (1971)
 Trastevere (1971)
 We Are All in Temporary Liberty (1971)
 Baron Blood (1972)
 The Black Decameron (1972)
 Zambo, il dominatore della foresta (1972)
 Decameron proibitissimo (1972)
 La cameriera (1974)
 Abbasso tutti, viva noi (1974)
 Rabid Dogs (1974)
 La badessa di Castro (1974)
 My Mother's Friend (1974)
 The House of Exorcism (1975)
 The Naked Doorwoman (1976)
 Ecco lingua d'argento (1976)
 The Black Maid (1976)
 Battle of the Stars (1977)
 Cosmos: War of the Planets (1977)
 Seagulls Fly Low (1977)
 War of the Robots (1978)
 Con la zia non è peccato (1980)
 Il matto (1980)

Television
La trincea (1961)
Il mondo è una prigione (1962)
Benedetti dal Signore (2004)

Dubbing roles

Animation
Captain Hook in Return to Never Land
Captain Hook in Disney's House of Mouse
Captain Hook in Mickey's Magical Christmas: Snowed in at the House of Mouse
Captain Hook in Mickey's House of Villains
Captain Hook in Jake and the Never Land Pirates
Palpatine / Darth Sidious in Star Wars: Clone Wars
Palpatine / Darth Sidious in Star Wars: The Clone Wars (film)
Palpatine / Darth Sidious in Star Wars: The Clone Wars
Palpatine / Darth Sidious in Star Wars Rebels
Horace Horsecollar in The Prince and the Pauper
Jiminy Cricket in Mickey's Christmas Carol (1990 redub)
Creeper in The Black Cauldron
Winston in Oliver & Company
Grandpa Bud in Meet the Robinsons
Papá Julio in Coco
Bilbo Baggins in The Lord of the Rings
Judge in Family Guy (season 11+)
King Stefan in Disney Princess Enchanted Tales: Follow Your Dreams
Secretary of the Interior in Planes: Fire & Rescue
Junior "Midnight" Moon in Cars 3
Spoons in Rango
Launchpad McQuack in DuckTales
Launchpad McQuack in DuckTales the Movie: Treasure of the Lost Lamp
Unwin in Disney's Adventures of the Gummi Bears
Stan Lee in Teen Titans Go! To the Movies

Live action
Bob Kelso in Scrubs
Palpatine in Star Wars: Episode I – The Phantom Menace
Palpatine / Darth Sidious in Star Wars: Episode II – Attack of the Clones
Palpatine / Darth Sidious in Star Wars: Episode V – The Empire Strikes Back (2004 edition)
Junior Soprano in The Sopranos
Mr. Chairman in Looney Tunes: Back in Action
Mortimer Duke in Trading Places
Mortimer Duke in Coming to America
Mr. Dawes Jr. in Mary Poppins Returns
Grandmaster servant in Thor: Ragnarok
Casino patron in Black Panther
School bus driver in Avengers: Infinity War
Pedestrian in Ant-Man and the Wasp
Stan Lee in Captain Marvel
Mayor Augustus Maywho in How the Grinch Stole Christmas
Gus in Night at the Museum: Secret of the Tomb
Donald Fallon in The Associate
Arthur Abbott in The Holiday
Jack Kelly in Road to Perdition
Art Selwyn in Cocoon
Art Selwyn in Cocoon: The Return
Barty Crouch Sr. in Harry Potter and the Goblet of Fire
Chattar Lal in Indiana Jones and the Temple of Doom
General Ross in Indiana Jones and the Kingdom of the Crystal Skull
Doc Cantrow in The Heartbreak Kid
Betelgeuse in Beetlejuice
Worryworth in The Hobbit: The Battle of the Five Armies
William Stryker Sr. in X-Men: First Class
Albert Garner in Going in Style
Merlin in King Arthur
Janos Slynt in Game of Thrones
Ethan Kanin in 24
Cousin Itt in The Addams Family
Sardo Numspa in The Golden Child
Candy in Of Mice and Men
Lyle Ferguson in Ghost
Winston Churchill in Inglourious Basterds
Prime Minister in Ali G Indahouse
Cecconi the Seller / Innkeeper of the Red Prawn in Pinocchio (English version)

Video games
Palpatine / Darth Sidious in Disney Infinity 3.0

References

External links

1930 births
Living people
Actors from Padua
Italian male film actors
Italian male voice actors
Italian male television actors
Italian male stage actors
Italian male video game actors
Italian film editors
20th-century Italian male actors
21st-century Italian male actors
Film people from Padua